Peter Watkins (born 29 October 1935) is an English film and television director.  He was born in Norbiton, Surrey, lived in Sweden, Canada and Lithuania for many years, and now lives in France. He is one of the pioneers of docudrama. His films present pacifist and radical ideas in a nontraditional style. He mainly concentrates his works and ideas around the mass media and our relation/participation to a movie or television documentary.

Nearly all of Watkins' films have used a combination of dramatic and documentary elements to dissect historical occurrences or possible near future events. The first of these, Culloden, portrayed the Jacobite uprising of 1745 in a documentary style, as if television reporters were interviewing the participants and accompanying them into battle; a similar device was used in his biographical film Edvard Munch. La Commune reenacts the Paris Commune days using a large cast of French non-actors.

In 2004, he wrote the book Media Crisis, which discusses his ideas of media hegemony which he calls, the monoform, and the lack of debate around the construction of new forms of audiovisual media.

Life
After doing his National Service with the East Surrey Regiment, followed by studying acting at the Royal Academy of Dramatic Art, Watkins began his television and film career as an assistant producer of short TV films and commercials; and in the early 1960s was an assistant editor and director of documentaries at the BBC. All of his films have either been documentary or drama presented with documentary techniques, sometimes portraying historical occurrences and sometimes possible near future events as if contemporary reporters and filmmakers were there to interview the participants. Watkins pioneered this technique in his first full-length television film, Culloden, which portrayed the Jacobite uprising of 1746 in a style similar to the Vietnam War reporting of the time. In 1965, he won a Jacob's Award for Culloden at the annual presentation ceremony in Dublin.

The scope and formal innovation of Culloden drew immediate critical acclaim for the previously unknown director, and the BBC commissioned him for another ambitious production, the nuclear-war docudrama The War Game, for The Wednesday Play series. The production was subsequently released to cinemas and won the 1966 Academy Award for Documentary Feature, eventually being screened by the BBC on 31 July 1985 after a 20-year ban.

His reputation as a political provocateur was amplified by Punishment Park, a story of violent political conflict in the United States that coincided with the Kent State Massacre. Opposition to war is a common theme of his work, but the films' political messages are often ambiguous, usually allowing the main characters to present violently opposing viewpoints which in many cases are improvised by the cast: in Punishment Park, the soldiers and dissidents were played by nonprofessional actors whose political opinions matched those of their characters so well that the director said he feared actual violence would break out on set. He took a similar approach in his Paris Commune re-enactment La Commune, using newspaper advertisements to recruit conservative actors who would have a genuine antipathy to the Commune rebels. Watkins is also known for political statements about the film and television media, writing extensively about flaws in television news and the dominance of the Hollywood-derived narrative style that he refers to as "the monoform".

After the banning of The War Game and the poor reception of his first non-television feature, Privilege, Watkins left England and has made all of his subsequent films abroad: The Gladiators in Sweden, Punishment Park in the United States, Edvard Munch in Norway, Evening Land in Denmark, Resan (a 14-hour film cycle about the threat of nuclear war) in ten different countries, and La Commune in France. Freethinker: The Life and Work of Peter Watkins, is a forthcoming biography by Patrick Murphy, a Senior Lecturer in Film and Television at York St John University and Dr John Cook. It is being compiled with Watkins' active help and participation.

Influence
Citing their 1969 Bed-in efforts and Peace Concert, an interviewer asked John Lennon and Yoko Ono, "Is there any one particular incident that got you started in this peace campaign?". John answered, "...the thing that really struck it off was a letter we got from a guy called Peter Watkins who made a film called The War Game. It was a very long letter stating just what's happening – how the media is really controlled, how it's all run, and everything else that people really know deep down. He said 'People in your position have a responsibility to use the media for world peace'. And we sat on the letter for about three weeks thinking 'Well, we're doing our best. All you need is love, man.' That letter just sort of sparked it all off. It was like getting your induction papers for peace!"

Films

by Peter Watkins
 1956 : The Web – 20 min. – Great Britain – English – black and white
 1958 : The Field of Red – Great Britain – English – black and white (lost)
 1959 : The Diary of an Unknown Soldier – 20 min. – Great Britain – English – black and white
 1961 : Forgotten Faces – 17 min. – Great Britain – English – black and white
 1964 : Culloden – 69 min.  – Great Britain – English and Scottish Gaelic – black and white. News reportage-style re-enactment of the decisive 1746 battle between forces led by the English William Augustus, Duke of Cumberland, and a Highland clan army led by Charles Edward Stuart, the "Bonnie Prince Charlie".
 1965 : The War Game – 48 min. – Great Britain – English – black and white Filmed in a documentary fashion and looks at the possible effects of nuclear war on England. Notable for its intense power and imagery. It later won the Academy Award for Best Documentary Feature, as well as the 1967 Best Documentary Feature award in Great Britain.
 1967 : Privilege – 103 min. – Great Britain – English – colourA performing singer placed in a futuristic totalitarian state, Steven Shorter (Paul Jones), is an intense character who sympathises with the youth of the nation. He becomes very popular, yet realises that his life is also controlled by the government. In 1978, Patti Smith recorded one of the film's songs, "Set Me Free" (as "Privilege (Set Me Free)") on her album Easter. The recording charted on the Top-100 lists in the UK (#72) and Ireland (#13).
 1969 : Gladiators (The Peace Game) – 69 min. – Sweden – English – colour Views war as a futuristic sporting event where it seems as if games are being played for a television audience.
 1971 : Punishment Park – 88 min. – United States – English – colourBased on the "siege mentality" of the police force during the 1970s. Protesters are given a choice for sentencing, and "Punishment Park" is one of the choices, in which the protesters must endure a three-day-long contest in a barren desert without food, while being pursued by armed National Guardsmen.
 1974 : Edvard Munch – 174 min (Theatrical) / 210 min (TV) – Sweden and Norway – English and Norvegian – colourMunch's life, emphasising his early years.
 1975 : The Seventies People – 127 min. – Denmark – Danish – colourFilmed for television, The Seventies Folk explores how the average citizen deals with the stress, life, work, school and family; resulting in the high suicide rate in Denmark.
 1975 : The Trap – 65 min. – Sweden – Swedish – colourIn the year 1999, totalitarianism prevails with the U.S.S.R. and U.S.A. colluding to govern the world by strict rules. Chaos erupts on the surface but state employees live safely underground. A radical and his son, visit his brother John's family in the bunkers and the discourse grows hot.
 1977 : Evening Land (Aftenlandet) – 109 min. – Denmark – Danish – colour, entered into the 10th Moscow International Film Festival.Portrays a fictitious Europe where the building of four nuclear missile capable submarines while the workers building them are shafted, leads to a group of radicals kidnapping the Danish EEC Minister in protest. Danish police deal brutally with the strikers, as well as the 'terrorists'.
 1988 : The Journey (Resan) – 873 min. – Australia, Canada, Denmark, Finland, Italy, Japan, New Zealand, USSR, Sweden, Norway – English, French – black and white, colourThe Journey: A Film for Peace; weaves together family interviews, the global arms race, survivors of the bombings in Hiroshima, Nagasaki, and Hamburg, community psychodramas of possible disaster scenarios, and works by other artists - from more than 100 hours of footage. Filmed in the United States, Canada, Norway, Scotland, France, West Germany, Mozambique, Japan, Australia, Tahiti, and Mexico.
 1991: The Media Project - 120 min. - Australia - colourDiscusses and critiques the Australian media coverage of the first gulf war and the way most news is made.
 1994 : The Freethinker – 276 min. – Sweden – Swedish – colourDocumentary portrait of the life of playwright August Strindberg, and the role of an artist, cultural critic, freethinker in society. The film unfolds in slow, non-chronological scenes, broken up by intertitles; with actors sometimes stepping out of character to comment on the characters they are playing, and incorporates scenes of ordinary people discussing issues the film raises.
 2000 : La Commune – 375 min. (full-length version) – France – French – black and whiteA historical re-enactment in a documentary style, of the situation after Napoleon III's defeat in which a group of working-class radicals formed the National Guard, refused to accept the authority of the French government and ruled Paris for four months.

about Peter Watkins
 2001 : The Universal Clock: The Resistance of Peter Watkins is a 77-minute documentary film about Watkins and the making of La Commune. The film is directed by Geoff Bowie and produced by the National Film Board of Canada. The universal clock refers to the synchronisation and the global movement of the televisions in the world, calibrated to be diffused anywhere around the globe, at any time.
 2001 : Peter Watkins – Lituania, Rebond for la Commune and Peter Watkins

References

Bibliography
 Montero, José Francisco & Paredes, Israel. Imágenes de la Revolución. 2011. Shangrila Ediciones
 Duarte, German A. La scomparsa dell'orologio universale. Peter Watkins e i mass media audiovisivi. 2009. Mimesis Edizioni Milano
 Duarte, German A. Conversaciones con Peter Watkins/Conversations With Peter Watkins. 2016. UTADEO Press

Further reading

External links
 Peter Watkins' official site
 BFI: Peter Watkins

 Notes on The Media Crisis An essay by Peter Watkins. MACBA, 2010.

1935 births
Alumni of RADA
Living people
English film directors
Jacob's Award winners
People educated at Christ College, Brecon
People from the Royal Borough of Kingston upon Thames
Directors of Best Documentary Feature Academy Award winners